Alexander von Eye (born September 16, 1949) is a German-American psychologist and former professor of Methods in Psychology at the University of Vienna in Vienna, Austria. Before joining the University of Vienna in 2012, he taught at Michigan State University, where he served as chair of the Unit of Developmental Psychology from 2003 to 2008. Before joining Michigan State University in 1993, he served as Professor of Human Development and Psychology at Penn State University. He has developed methods for analyzing categorical and longitudinal data in psychology. He is a fellow of the American Psychological Association and the American Psychological Society. As of 2015, he lived in Montpellier, France.

Bibliography
Psychologische Prävention - Grundlagen, Programme, Methoden. (with Brandtstädter, J.) Bern: Huber, 1982. , 
Semantische Dimensionen. Verhaltenstheoretische Konzepte einer psychologischen Semantik.. (with Marx, W.) Göttingen: Hogrefe., 1984. , 
Individual development and social change: Explanatory analysis.. (with Nesselroade, J.R.) New York: Academic Press, 1985. , 
Introduction to Configural Frequenccy Analysis: The search for types and antitypes in cross-classifications. Cambridge: Cambridge University Press, 1990. 
Statistical methods in longitudinal research, Vol. 1: Principles and structuring change. New York: Academic Press, 1990. , 
Statistical methods in longitudinal research, Vol. 2: Time series and categorical longitudinal data. New York: Academic Press, 1990. , 
Applied computational statistics in longitudinal research. (with Rovine, M. J.) New York: Academnic Press, 1991. , 
Prädiktionsanalyse: Vorhersagen mit kategorialen Variablen. Weinheim: Psychologie Verlagsunion, 1991. , 
Erziehungswissenschaftliche Statistik. Eine elementare Einführung für pädagogische Berufe.. (with Lienert, G. A.) Weinheim: Beltz, 1994. , 
Latent variables analysis - Applications for developmental research. (with Clogg, C.C.) Newbury Park, CA: Sage, 1994. , 
Analysis of categorical variables in developmental research.. San Diego, CA: Academic Press, 1996. , 
Regression analysis for social sciences - models and applications. (with Schuster, C.) San Diego: Academic Press, 1998. , 
Growing up in times of social change. (with Silbereisen, R.K.) Berlin: De Gruyter, 1999. , 
Statistical analysis of longitudinal categorical data - An introduction with computer illustrations. (with Niedermeier, K.E.) Mahwah, NJ: Lawrence Erlbaum, 1999. , 
Configural Frequency Analysis - Methods, Models, and Applications. Mahwah, NJ: Lawrence Erlbaum, 2002. , 
Pathways to positive youth development among diverse Youth. (with Lerner, R.M., Taylor, C.S.) San Francisco: Jossey-Bass, 2002. , 
Structural equation modeling. Applications in Ecological and Evolutionary Biology. (with Pugesek, B., Tomer, A.) Cambridge, UK: Cambridge, 2003. , 
Analyzing rater agreement - manifest variable approaches. (with Mun, E.Y.) Mahwah, NJ: Lawrence Erlbaum, 2005. , 
Advances in Configural Frequency Analysis. (with Mair, P., & Mun, E.-Y.) New York: Guilford Press, 2010.  
Log-linear modeling - Concepts, Interpretation and Applications. (with Mun, E.-Y.) New York: Wiley, 2013. , 
Dependent data in social sciences research: Forms, issues, and methods of analysis. (with Stemmler, M., Wiedermann, W.) New York: Springer, 2015. , 
Statistics and Causality: Methods for Applied Empirical Research. (with Wiedermann, W.) Hoboken, NJ: Wiley, 2016. , 
Direction Dependence in Statistical Models: Methods of Analysis. (with Wiedermann, W., Kim, D., Sungur, E.) Hoboken, NJ: Wiley, 2020. , 
DieKonfigurationsfrequenzanalyse. (with Wiedermann, W.) Berlin: Springer (in preparation), 2021.
Configural Frequency Analysis. (with Wiedermann, W.) Berlin: Springer (in preparation), 2021.

References

External links
Faculty profile at Michigan State University

Living people
German psychologists
21st-century American psychologists
German emigrants to the United States
Scientists from Leipzig
1949 births
Ludwig Maximilian University of Munich alumni
University of Trier alumni
Academic staff of the University of Vienna
Michigan State University faculty
Pennsylvania State University faculty
Fellows of the American Psychological Association
Fellows of the Association for Psychological Science
20th-century American psychologists